Liridon Ilaz Leci (born 11 February 1985) is a Kosovan professional footballer who last played as a left-back for Kosovan club Llapi.

Club career

Match fixing scandal
On 7 October 2014. Swedish investigative journalism television program Uppdrag granskning published an interview with Leci, filmed with a hidden camera. In the interview, he admits his involvement in match fixing. On the recording, he blatantly speaks about his contacts in the second tier league Superettan and particularly Sweden's highest football league, Allsvenskan.

Return to Prishtina
On 14 June 2016. Leci joined Football Superleague of Kosovo side Prishtina. His performances throughout the year earned him a spot at 2017 Football Superleague of Kosovo's Team of the Year and he along with Armend Dallku were the only Prishtina players to be selected.

On 30 April 2017. Leci was arrested from Kosovo Police during the match against Besa Pejë in Peć after he entered the field even though he was punished with a red card, this happened after the injury of goalkeeper Alban Muqiqi and for this action, except that he was sentenced by the police was also sentenced by the Football Federation of Kosovo with two non-match games.

Drita
On 19 July 2017. Leci joined Football Superleague of Kosovo side Drita, along with his teammate Endrit Krasniqi.

International career
On 17 February 2010. Leci made his debut with Kosovo in a friendly match against Albania after coming on as a substitute.

Personal life
Leci was born in Pristina, SFR Yugoslavia from Kosovo Albanian parents. On 19 September 2013, he obtained Albanian passport.

References

External links

1985 births
Living people
Sportspeople from Pristina
Kosovan footballers
Kosovo pre-2014 international footballers
Kosovan expatriate footballers
Expatriate footballers in Albania
Kosovan expatriate sportspeople in Albania
Expatriate footballers in Sweden
Kosovan expatriate sportspeople in Sweden
Association football fullbacks
Football Superleague of Kosovo players
FC Prishtina players
KF Hajvalia players
FC Drita players
KF Llapi players
Kategoria Superiore players
KF Elbasani players
Flamurtari Vlorë players
Besa Kavajë players
KF Vllaznia Shkodër players
KS Kastrioti players
Match fixers
Allsvenskan players
Kalmar FF players
Landskrona BoIS players
Superettan players